Valeria De Franciscis (14 December 1915 – 9 February 2014) was an Italian actress. She is best known for her performance as Gianni's mother in The Salt of Life, for which she received a nomination for the David di Donatello for Best Supporting Actress at the age of 96.

Selected filmography

References

External links 

1915 births
2014 deaths
Italian film actresses